Ari Gold is the debut album of American musician and singer Ari Gold.

Overview

Ari Gold was recorded from 1996 to 2000. Only a limited run was printed, without the backing of a major label. Billboard magazine wrote that the CD is "...steeped in sticky pop melodies, sing-along hooks, and butt-shakin' funk rhythms... solid radio-ready material. Gold is about to hit pay dirt!" The album is notable for directly referring to homosexual relationships. In "Write Me a Love Song", Gold sings about his lover asking him to write him a love song, one that speaks specifically to their love, the love between two men. The album includes the original version of "Wave of You" as well as "Home", a song that was originally written for Kevin Aviance. "Home" was included on the Human Rights Campaign's 2005 benefit album Love Rocks. Ari Gold won the 2002 Outmusic Award for Outstanding Debut Recording.

Track listing
"Should I Get Over You" [5:13]
"See Through Me" [4:00]
"Wave of You" [4:05]
"Write Me a Love Song" [4:17]
"Things I Need to Hear" [3:37]
"Don't Come for Me" [4:50]
"So Many Things" [4:36]
"Just a Little Love" [3:53]
"Home" [4:34]
"Give Me All Your Love" [6:27]

References

2001 debut albums
Ari Gold (musician) albums